(), known in Japan as , is a  fictional character from the Darkstalkers fighting game franchise. She was introduced in Night Warriors: Darkstalkers' Revenge in 1995. Together, they fight to free the cursed spirit of their dead mother and to destroy the monsters preying on the people of China.

Hsien-Ko has since become one of the franchise's more popular characters, garnering positive fan and critical reception. She has also appeared on official Darkstalkers merchandise and as a playable character in several games outside the series.

Appearances

In video games
According to her Night Warriors: Darkstalkers' Revenge backstory, Hsien-Ko and her twin sister, Mei-Ling, were born in 1730s China (Qing dynasty). During a time when undead spirits arose and attacked a rural village, their mother was killed in her attempt to save the village, the twins, fought to release her soul from the dark by using a forbidden spell called "Igyo Tenshin no Jutsu". This, in turn, converted them into a jiāngshī ("hopping corpse"), a type of Chinese zombie. Mei-Ling is actually the fú ("ward-paper"), a parchment-like talisman that is attached to the front of Hsien-Ko's hat. While the conversion infused Hsien-Ko with magical powers, they are formidable enough that Mei-Ling's presence as the ward-paper is required to keep them in check. The twins' transformation results in them fighting as a Darkhunter as a combined single unit of mind and body. In Hsien-Ko's Darkstalkers' Revenge ending, the girls free their mother's soul, albeit at the cost of their own lives, but their mother, as a reward, enables them to be reborn as infants in a new life. In Hsien-Ko's Darkstalkers 3 storyline, which makes no mention of the twins' mother, they discover that they are connected psychically after experiencing the same dream on the night of their sixteenth birthday, but the very next night they both suffer a nightmare and fall into a coma, which in turn sees their collective consciousness transported into Majigen. After awakening in this foreign territory, they find they have gained new powers simply from unleashing the power of an unspecified forbidden spell and team up to fight their way out of the realm.

Hsien-Ko has made several other appearances in crossover titles. She appears as a playable character in Namco × Capcom, and is paired with Fong Ling from Resident Evil: Dead Aim as a single unit, while in Project X Zone she is paired up with Frank West from Dead Rising. Hsien-Ko is also playable in Super Puzzle Fighter II Turbo, Super Gem Fighter Mini Mix, SNK vs. Capcom: Card Fighters Clash, SNK vs. Capcom: Card Fighters 2 Expand Edition, SNK vs. Capcom: Card Fighters DS, Marvel vs. Capcom 3: Fate of Two Worlds (where Hsien-Ko and Mei-Ling arrive to ask Doctor Strange to help them save their mother's soul), Ultimate Marvel vs. Capcom 3, Onimusha Soul (redesigned for a feudal Japan setting), and Street Fighter: Puzzle Spirits.

Hsien-Ko has her own mobile game, Lei-Lei's Magical Hammer, released in the West simply as Magical Hammer and later remade as Line Drop: Spirit Hunter Lei-Lei. She was originally planned to be playable in Tatsunoko vs. Capcom, but was dropped due to time constraints. She has also made cameo appearances: in some versions of Marvel Super Heroes where she can be summoned by Anita; in Capcom vs. SNK 2 as a restaurant patron in the Shanghai stage; in Street Fighter Alpha 2 as one of the party guests, along with her sister, in Ken's stage; and in Zombie Cafe in a guest appearance. Her guest appearances in collaboration events within assorted mobile games have included The Knights of Avalon and The Samurai Kingdom.

Design

Hsien-Ko (Lei-Lei) was chiefly created by Night Warriors: Darkstalkers' Revenge planners Haruo Murata and Noritaka Funamizu and graphically designed by Hitoshi Nishio, an artist responsible for the look of the new characters in the game. It was the first time Nishio has worked on a female character. In the beginning, Funamizu envisioned two human sisters who would have fought together, in a way similar to Morrigan Aensland's "Astral Vision" special move that makes Morrigan's double appear on other side of the screen and mirror her every move. That idea was abandoned due to the problems related to programming character control problems. Murata decided a lone Hsien-Ko would be too weak as a human being, and so he came up with the jiangshi idea "but Lei-Lei can't control her powers alone, so she fights with her sister transformed into an ofuda". Nishio said: "After drawing Lei-Lei’s graphics I watched a real Chinese jiangshi movie, and I got a little worried about how Lei-Lei would be able to move around with that ofuda covering her eyes. (laughs) That was why I made Lin-Lin the ofuda".

Hsien-Ko's arsenal for her comedic "Anki Hou" special attack (throwing various projectiles including swords, daggers, axes, sledgehammers, kunai, shuriken, boomerangs, fuse bombs, chains, weights, bonsai trees, bronze statues, and Chun Li's bracelets) was created as team members would propose to add more items. According to another planner/designer, Junichi Ohno, Hsien-Ko was too strong at first and had to be balanced. Composer Takayuki Iwaim experimented with Hsien-Ko stage's background music in a way that he thought would match her character image while trying to "remove some of the 'dark' image the first game had".

Gameplay

In the games, most of Hsien-Ko's powers "involve floating on air and pulling an impossibly huge collection of deadly items out of their sleeves". According to Sega Saturn Magazine, unlike the other Darkstalkers characters, Hsien-Ko "is a mostly defensive character and hence spends most of the game blocking attacks and storing special gauges. She is excellent for countering moves and combos and a number of projectile attacks give her the edge in long range attacks". She is one of the characters that  can dash past an opponent and get behind them. Though Mei-Ling has never been a playable character in any of the games, a special move in Darkstalkers 3 involves her coming out to team up with Hsien-Ko.

A cheat code in Super Puzzle Fighter II Turbo, where Hsien-Ko and the other characters appear in a super-deformed state, allows access to Mei-Ling as a playable. According to GamesRadar, the Marvel vs. Capcom 3: Fate of Two Worlds version of Hsien-Ko (an unlockable character capable of interacting with Chris Redfield) is "an extremely unorthodox character with a number of strange moves and weird mobility". She was judged not good for beginners as her "weird normal attacks and bizarre movement options" and attacks are likely to confuse new players. The  DLC Evil Twin Costume Pack includes Mei-Ling as an alternate skin for Hsien-Ko's model in Ultimate Marvel vs. Capcom 3.

Other appearances
Hsien-Ko and Mei-Ling make their first appearance in the second episode of the 1997 anime miniseries Night Warriors: Darkstalkers' Revenge. The twins travel Earth in an old T-bucket-style convertible with a trailer resembling a covered wagon attached. Their personalities, and speech patterns in the English dub of the program, differed considerably; Mei-Ling is the more sensible of the pair and speaks eloquently, whereas Hsien-Ko has a more childlike disposition, and her dialogue often contains modern colloquialisms or improper grammar (often saying "don't" in place of "doesn't"). She also appears in the 1995 American cartoon series that is loosely based on the games (in the episodes "Ghost Hunter" and "Darkest Before Dawn"), where Hsien-Ko's backstory was altered like those of several characters, in her case her transformation having resulted from her accidentally consuming a substance she mistook for rice that was hidden under a floorboard inside a hut.

The character appears in other Darkstalkers media, such as the comic and manga adaptations of Night Warriors: Darkstalkers' Revenge by Run Ishida; and Itou Mami's Maleficarum, as well as in the 2004 card game Universal Fighting System by Jasco Games. Multiple Hsien-Ko figures and resin garage kits were released by various manufacturers, including FuRyu, among others. Capcom produced Hsien-Ko T-shirts and Banpresto released a series of mascot key chains.

Reception and cultural impact
Hsien-Ko was well received by Western critics as one of the most remarkable characters in the series already filled with unusual characters, and have been noted as a popular fan favourite by many publications such as Complex, Eurogamer, Hardcore Gaming 101, and Siliconera, as well as by individuals such as Hi Score Girl author Rensuke Oshikiri. Japanese arcade gaming magazine Gamest named Lei-Lei as the seventh best character of 1995, as well as 32nd in 1997. Also in 1997, Japanese Sega Saturn Magazine ranked her as the 35th best female character on the Sega Saturn.

Described as "scary but also sort of hilarious, a highly tactical fighter" by GamesRadar and as "one of the funniest characters around" by EGM2, Hsien-Ko was one of favorite female Asian video game characters of GameDaily's Robert Workman, who opined she "definitely has good looks, despite her oversized hands", while WhatCulture ranked her as the 28th greatest female fighting game character of all time. In 2013, Retro Gamer chose her one of the 19 "coolest fighters from the last 30 years", declaring that fellow Darkstalkers characters "Felicia, Demitri and B.B. Hood are equally well known, but Lei-Lei is a more unusual example of a popular character as she's so unorthodox and difficult to use effectively".

Japanese singer and voice actress Reina Kondō used Lei-Lei as her nickname. The Skullgirls character Peacock's design was partially inspired by Hsien-Ko, and the game's first prototype around 1999 actually used her and Chun-Li sprites for testing.

See also
List of Darkstalkers characters

Notes

References

External links

 Hsien-Ko's Darkstalkers entry at StrategyWiki

Undead characters in video games
Darkstalkers characters
Twin characters in video games
Female characters in anime and manga
Female characters in video games
Fictional blade and dart throwers
Fictional Chinese people in video games
Capcom protagonists
Fictional duos
Ghost characters in video games
Fictional hunters in video games
Orphan characters in video games
Vampire characters in video games
Video game characters introduced in 1995
Video game characters who can teleport
Video game characters who can move at superhuman speeds
Video game characters with superhuman strength
Video game mascots
Zombie and revenant characters in video games
Fictional Qing dynasty people
Video game characters who use magic
Woman soldier and warrior characters in video games
Fictional people from the 18th-century